Nigar Hatun ("Lovely" or "Artistic beauty"; died March 1503) was a consort of Sultan Bayezid II of the Ottoman Empire.

Life
Nigar entered in Bayezid's harem when Bayezid was still a prince, and the governor of Amasya. She gave birth to three children, a son, Şehzade Korkut in 1467 or in 1469, and daughters, Fatma Sultan and Ayşe Sultan. With Korkud's birth, she acquired a greater status within the royal household.
 
According to Turkish tradition, all princes were expected to work as provincial governors as a part of their training. Korkud was first appointed to Tire in 1483. The mother and son, along with his newly formed retinue were provisioned in Grand Vizier Ishak Pasha's palace. Nigar's daily stipend consisted of 50 akçe (silver coin). In late 1490s, she accompanied him to Manisa,  and then to Antalya in 1502.

Issue 
From Bayezid II, Nigar had two daughters and a son:
 Ayşe Sultan (Amasya, 1465 - Constantinople, after 1515). She had two sons and five daughters.
 Sofu Fatma Sultan (Amasya, 1468 - Bursa, after 1520). She married three times: before 1580 with Isfendiyaroglu Mirza Mehmed Pasha, son of Kyzyl Ahmed Bey, with him she had a son, Sultanzade Mehmed Pasha (who married his cousin Gevherhan Sultan. The married ended with a divorce. Fatma rimmaried in 1489 with Mustafa Pasha, son of Koca Davud Pasha. Fatma widowed in 1503. Fatma married for third time in 1504 with Güzelce Hasan Bey. With him had two sons, Sultanzade Haci Ahmed Bey and Sultanzade Mehmed Celebi (who married his cousin Ayşe Sultan, daughter of Şehzade Alemşah), and a daughter (who married her cousin Ahmed Bey, son Ali Bey and Fatma Hanımsultan, daughter di Ayşe Sultan (daughter of Bayezid II).
 Şehzade Korkut (Amasya, 1469 - Manisa, March 10, 1513). One of the main rivals of his half-brother Selim I for the throne was exiled and executed by him. He had two children who died as infants and two daughters.

Death
Nigar Hatun died in March 1503, and was buried in her own mausoleum, which she had built in 1502, just a year before her death at Yivliminare Mosque, Antalya.

After her death, Korkud made an endowment in the memory of his mother in a small town named Istanos on the Teke Peninsula. In 1509–10, her daughter Fatma, also made an endowment at Eşrefoğlu Rûmî for the sake of her soul.

References

Sources

15th-century consorts of Ottoman sultans
1452 births
1515 deaths
16th-century consorts of Ottoman sultans